Luis Enríquez Grajeda (born 28 December 1986) is a Mexican professional boxer. He is signed with Oscar De La Hoya's Company Golden Boy Promotions.

Amateur career
Grajeda had an impressive amateur career, winning the Mexican National Championships in 2005 and 2007. Luis would also get to the quarterfinals of the 2007 Pan American Games.

Professional career
Grajeda turned professional on May 24, 2008, stopping Juan Pablo Vazquez in the 2nd round. He fought a tough four round battle with Jair Cena ending in an MD win, Grajeda has improved, winning each of his next 4 matches by 1st-round KO. 
In a Friday Night Fights card Grajeda took a four-round unanimous decision over Osvaldo Rojas.

Professional record

|- style="margin:0.5em auto; font-size:95%;"
|align="center" colspan=8|18 Wins (14 knockouts), 5 Losses, 2 Draw
|- style="margin:0.5em auto; font-size:95%;"
|align=center style="border-style: none none solid solid; background: #e3e3e3"|Res.
|align=center style="border-style: none none solid solid; background: #e3e3e3"|Record
|align=center style="border-style: none none solid solid; background: #e3e3e3"|Opponent
|align=center style="border-style: none none solid solid; background: #e3e3e3"|Type
|align=center style="border-style: none none solid solid; background: #e3e3e3"|Rd., Time
|align=center style="border-style: none none solid solid; background: #e3e3e3"|Date
|align=center style="border-style: none none solid solid; background: #e3e3e3"|Location
|align=center style="border-style: none none solid solid; background: #e3e3e3"|Notes
|-align=center
|Loss  || 18-5-2 ||align=left| Terrell Gausha
|UD|| 8  || 2015-06-20 || align=left| MGM Grand, Grand Garden Arena, Las Vegas, Nevada, USA
|align=left|
|-align=center
|Loss  || 18-4-2 ||align=left| Austin Trout
|RTD|| 7 (10) || 2014-12-11 || align=left| Pechanga Resort & Casino, Temecula, California
|align=left|
|-align=center
|Win  || 18-3-2 ||align=left| Charly Soto
|TKO|| 3 (?) || 2014-11-15 || align=left| Club de Veteranos bamoa Pueblo, Guasave, Sinaloa
|align=left|
|-align=center
|Loss  || 17-3-2 ||align=left| Willie Nelson
|UD|| 10 || 2014-08-08 || align=left| Churchill County Fairgrounds, Fallon, Nevada
|align=left|
|-align=center
|Draw  || 17-2-2 ||align=left| Said El Harrak
|SD|| 8 || 2014-05-20 || align=left| Santa Monica Pier, Santa Monica, California
|align=left|
|-align=center
|Lose || 17-2-1 ||align=left| Pablo Munguia
|SD|| 8 || 2014-02-08 || align=left| San Luis Potosi, San Luis Potosí, Mexico
|align=left|
|-align=center
|Win || 17-1-1 ||align=left| Manuel Garcia
|KO|| 8(8) || 2013-10-19 || align=left| Jose Cuervo Salon, Polanco, Distrito Federal, Mexico
|align=left|
|-align=center
|Win || 16-1-1 ||align=left| Josue Atilano Mendoza
|KO|| 1(8) || 2013-09-27 || align=left| Jose Cuervo Salon, Polanco, Distrito Federal, Mexico
|align=left|
|-align=center
|Win || 15-1-1 ||align=left| Octavio Castro
|TKO|| 7(12) || 2013-05-31 || align=left| Centro Historico, Chihuahua, Chihuahua, Mexico
|align=left|
|-align=center
|Win || 14-1-1 ||align=left| Francisco Javier Reza
|UD|| 10(10) || 2012-11-16  || align=left| Ciudad Parral, Chihuahua, Mexico
|align=left|
|-align=center
|Win || 13-1-1 ||align=left| Hector Camacho Jr
|KO|| 6(1:28) || 2012-07-28  || align=left| Parque el Palomar, Chihuahua, Chihuahua, Mexico
|align=left|
|-align=center
|Win || 12-1-1 ||align=left| Alberto Martinez
|KO|| ? || 2012-06-09  || align=left| Gimnasio Manuel Bernardo Aguirre, Chihuahua, Chihuahua, Mexico
|align=left|
|-align=center
|Win || 11-1-1 ||align=left| Nestor Antonio Figueroa
|KO|| 1(1:44) || 2012-03-03  || align=left| Gimnasio Municipal, Delicias, Chihuahua, Mexico
|align=left|
|-align=center
|Loss || 10-1-1 ||align=left| Jermell Charlo
|UD|| 8(8) || 2010-11-12  || align=left| State Farm Arena, Hidalgo, Texas, United States
|align=left|
|-align=center
|Draw || 10-0-1 ||align=left| Alan Sanchez
|PTS|| 8(8) || 2010-09-10  || align=left| Four Points Sheraton Hotel, San Diego, California, United States
|align=left|
|-align=center
|Win || 10-0-0 ||align=left| Cristian Favela
|UD || 6(6) || 2010-06-11  || align=left| Four Points Sheraton Hotel, San Diego, California, United States
|align=left|
|-align=center
|Win || 9-0-0 || align=left|  Osvaldo Rojas 
|UD || 4(4) || 2010-02-26  || align=left| Don Haskins Convention Center, El Paso, Texas, United States
|align=left|
|-align=center
|Win || 8-0-0 || align=left|  Ruben Amezcua 
|TKO || 6(8) || 2009-12-12  || align=left|Auditorio Miguel Barragan, San Luis Potosí, Mexico
|align=left|
|-align=center
|Win || 7-0-0 || align=left| Juan Carlos Diaz  
|KO || 2(2:48) || 2009-10-10 || align=left|Nokia Theater, Los Angeles, California, United States
|align=left|
|-align=center
|Win || 6-0-0 || align=left| Aaron Martinez
|TKO || 1(0:31) || 2009-04-25 || align=left|Arena Miguel Canto Solis, Cozumel, Quintana Roo, Mexico
|align=left|
|-align=center
|Win || 5-0-0 || align=left| Alejandro Herrera   
|KO || 1(4) || 2009-02-21 || align=left|Auditorio Benito Juárez, Zapopan, Jalisco, Mexico
|align=left|
|-align=center
|Win || 4-0-0 || align=left|  Gilberto Avila   
|TKO || 1(4) || 2009-01-31 || align=left|Palenque del FEX, Mexicali, Baja California, Mexico
|align=left|
|-align=center
|Win || 3-0-0 || align=left| Mario Ramirez   
|KO || 1(1:28) || 2008-11-01 || align=left|Gimnasio Manuel Bernardo Aguirre, Chihuahua, Chihuahua, Mexico
|align=left|
|-align=center
|Win || 2-0-0 || align=left| Jair Cena 
|MD || 4(4) || 2008-09-20 || align=left|Arena Coliseo, Monterrey, Nuevo León, Mexico
|align=left|
|-align=center
|Win || 1-0-0 || align=left| Juan Pablo Vazquez    
|TKO || 2(1:09) || 2008-05-24 || align=left|La Feria de Santa Rita, Chihuahua, Chihuahua, Mexico
|align=left|

References

External links 
 

People from Chihuahua City
Boxers from Chihuahua (state)
Welterweight boxers
1986 births
Living people
Mexican male boxers